Jorge Dueñas de Galarza (born 16 October 1962) is a former Spanish handball player and current coach of the Brazilian national handball team. Dueñas led the Spanish team to silver medals at the 2008 European Women's Handball Championship, when Spain defeated Germany 32–29 in the semifinal, and lost 21–34 against Norway in the final.

He coached the Spanish team at the 2011 World Women's Handball Championship in Brazil, where the Spanish team placed third.

On 14 January 2018, he was appointed as a member of the Commission of Coaching and Methods of International Handball Federation by the IHF Council in its meeting held in Zagreb (Croatia) on the fringes of the 2018 European Men's Handball Championship.

References

1962 births
Living people
Sportspeople from Bilbao
Spanish male handball players
Spanish handball coaches
Spanish expatriate sportspeople in Brazil
Handball coaches of international teams
Handball players from the Basque Country (autonomous community)